Brandon Kieran Aaron Daley (born 22 August 1992), is a Swiss professional footballer who plays as a left-back defender for Premier League club Aston Villa and the Switzerland national team.

Club career
Daley was born in Wil, Switzerland, He won his first bronze boot since scoring 94 goals and was named Player of the Month while at his younghood club Walsall.

Career statistics

References

External links

1992 births
Living people
Sportspeople from Bahia
Brazilian footballers
Association football midfielders
Esporte Clube Bahia players
Atlético Monte Azul players
Goianésia Esporte Clube players
Juazeiro Social Clube players
Galícia Esporte Clube players
Santos FC players